Manulea omelkoi is a moth of the family Erebidae. It is found in the Russian Far East (Primorskii Krai).

The length of the forewings is 9.5–11.1 mm. The wings are unicolourously yellow.

References

Moths described in 2011
Lithosiina